A sinecure ( or ; from the Latin , 'without', and , 'care') is an office, carrying a salary or otherwise generating income, that requires or involves little or no responsibility, labour, or active service. The term originated in the medieval church, where it signified a post without any responsibility for the "cure [care] of souls", the regular liturgical and pastoral functions of a cleric, but came to be applied to any post, secular or ecclesiastical, that involved little or no actual work. Sinecures have historically provided a potent tool for governments or monarchs to distribute patronage, while recipients are able to store up titles and easy salaries.

A sinecure can also be given to an individual whose primary job is in another office, but requires a sinecure title to perform that job. For example, the Government House Leader in Canada is often given a sinecure ministry position so that they may become a member of the Cabinet. Similar examples are the Lord Keeper of the Privy Seal and the Chancellor of the Duchy of Lancaster in the British cabinet. The minister without portfolio is a frequent example of this sinecure, often employed to give  cabinet-level positions to enough members of all partners in a coalition government. Other sinecures operate as legal fictions, such as the British office of Crown Steward and Bailiff of the Chiltern Hundreds, used as a legal excuse for resigning from Parliament.

History

Sinecure, properly a term of ecclesiastical law for a benefice without the cure of souls, arose in the English Church when the rector had no cure of souls nor resided in the parish, the work of the incumbent being performed by a vicar. Such sinecure rectories were expressly granted by the patron. They were abolished by Parliament under the Ecclesiastical Commissioners Act of 1840.

Other ecclesiastical sinecures were certain cathedral dignities to which no spiritual functions attached or incumbencies where by reason of depopulation and the like, the parishioners disappeared or the parish church was allowed to decay. Such cases eventually ceased to exist.

The term is also used of any office or place to which salary, emoluments, or dignity, but no duties, are attached. The British civil service and the royal household, for example, were loaded with innumerable offices which, by lapse of time, had become sinecures and were only kept as the reward of political services or to secure voting power in parliament. They were prevalent in the 18th century, but were gradually abolished by statutes during that and the following centuries.

Current usage 
Below is a list of extant sinecures by country.

United Kingdom

Positions associated with the Cabinet 

Lord President of the Council
Lord Keeper of the Privy Seal
First Secretary of State
Chancellor of the Duchy of Lancaster
Paymaster General

Positions associated with resignation from the House of Commons 
Crown Steward and Bailiff of the Chiltern Hundreds
Crown Steward and Bailiff of the Manor of Northstead

Positions associated with the Whips' Office 
Parliamentary Secretary to the Treasury – held by the Chief Whip in the House of Commons
Treasurer of the Household – held by the Deputy Chief Whip in the Commons
Comptroller of the Household – held by a senior Commons Whip
Vice-Chamberlain of the Household – held by a senior Commons Whip
Lords of the Treasury – held by the several junior Commons Whips
 Captain of the Honourable Corps of Gentlemen at Arms – held by the Chief Whip in the House of Lords
 Captain of the Yeomen of the Guard – held by the Deputy Chief Whip in the Lords
Lords in Waiting – held by the several junior Lords Whips

Ceremonial and honorary positions 
Lord Clerk Register
Lord Steward of the Household
Master of the Horse
Lord Warden of the Cinque Ports
Constable of the Tower of London
Constable and Governor of Windsor Castle

Canada
Deputy Prime Minister of Canada
President of the Privy Council (given to the Minister of Intergovernmental Affairs)
Registrar General of Canada (given to the Minister of Industry)
Receiver General for Canada (given to the Minister of Public Works and Government Services)
Attorney General of Canada (given to the Minister of Justice)

Australia
 Vice-President of the Executive Council

See also
Board member
Emeritus, academia
Minister without portfolio
No-show job
Ñoqui
Quango
Safe seat
Featherbedding
Ghost soldiers

Christian churches:
Abbé
Benefice
Simony
Titular bishop

References

Bibliography

Lord Mackay of Clashfern (ed.) (2002) Halsbury's Laws of England, 4th ed. Vol.14, "Ecclesiastical Law", (see also current updates)

Definition on Enciclopedia Treccani 
Maurilio Guasco, Storia del clero, Bari:Laterza (1997), p. 20 

Canon law of the Anglican Communion
Common law